John Eggleston III (born 1966) is an American politician. He is a member of the Missouri House of Representatives from the 2nd District, first elected in 2014. He is a member of the Republican Party. As of 2022, he is term-limited and cannot run for reelection to the Missouri House, so he has filed to run for Missouri Senate District 12.

Electoral history

State Reprentative
 J. Eggleston was unopposed in his first Republican primary election in 2014.

References

Living people
Republican Party members of the Missouri House of Representatives
21st-century American politicians
1966 births
People from Maysville, Missouri